Bob Bates (September 1, 1923 – September 13, 1981) was an American jazz bassist.

Early life 
Bates was born in Pocatello, Idaho. His mother was an organist, while his brothers Norman and Jim were also bassists. As a youth, he played tuba, trumpet, and trombone. He then studied classical bass from 1944 to 1948 and played with Sonny Dunham in 1946 and 1947. Bates began performing with Jack Fina in the late 1940s.

Career 
Early in the 1950s, Bates played in the Two Beaux & a Peep Trio. He was the bassist in the popular Dave Brubeck Quartet between 1953 and 1955. In addition to Brubeck, Bates also recorded with Paul Desmond in 1954, and Dave Pell in 1956. He stopped playing at around this time.

Personal life 
Bates died in 1981 in San Francisco, at the age of 58.

Discography
With Dave Brubeck
Dave Brubeck at Storyville: 1954 (Columbia, 1954)
Jazz Goes to College (Columbia, 1954)
Brubeck Time (Columbia, 1954)
Jazz: Red Hot and Cool (Columbia, 1954–55)
With Paul Desmond
Desmond (Fantasy, 1954)
With Dave Pell
Jazz Goes Dancing (1956)

References

1923 births
1981 deaths
20th-century American musicians
American jazz double-bassists
Male double-bassists
Musicians from Idaho
People from Pocatello, Idaho
Jazz musicians from San Francisco
20th-century double-bassists
20th-century American male musicians
American male jazz musicians
Dave Brubeck Quartet members
Jazz musicians from Idaho